Vladyslav Shkolnyi (born 14 March 2000) is a Ukrainian professional footballer who plays as a midfielder for FC Chernihiv in Ukrainian First League.

Player career
In 2019, he started his career at SDYuShOR Desna and then moved to Desna-3 Chernihiv, the youth academy and reserve squad of Desna Chernihiv.

FC Chernihiv
On 23 August 2022 he signed for FC Chernihiv in the Ukrainian First League. On 15 October, he made his debut against Skoruk Tomakivka.

Career statistics

Club

References

External links
 Vladyslav Shkolnyi at FC Chernihiv 
 Vladyslav Shkolnyi at upl.ua 

2002 births
Living people
Footballers from Chernihiv
SDYuShOR Desna players
FC Desna-3 Chernihiv players
FC Chernihiv players
Ukrainian footballers
Association football midfielders
Ukrainian First League players